State Route 365 (SR 365) is a  state highway that travels within portions of Gwinnett, Hall, Habersham, and Stephens counties. It begins at exit 113 on Interstate 85 (I-85), at the southeastern edge of Suwanee. This is also the southern terminus of I-985. It continues from that point concurrent with I-985 for the entire length of that freeway. Eventually, U.S. Route 23 (US 23) also joins the concurrency. The highway heads northeast through Gainesville and Toccoa, before it terminates at the South Carolina state line, southwest of Westminster, South Carolina.

Route description

Gwinnett County
In Gwinnett County, SR 365 begins concurrent with I-985 at an interchange with I-85 on the southeastern edge of Suwanee. The two highways head northeast to Buford, at an interchange with US 23/SR 20 (Buford Drive N.E.). Here, US 23 joins the concurrency.

Hall County
The three routes head northeast into Hall County and have an interchange with SR 347. In Flowery Branch they have an interchange with Spout Springs Road at the Rankin Smith Interchange. Then they enter Oakwood, and have an interchange with SR 53 (Mundy Mill Road); access to SR 53 from southbound I-985/US 23/SR 365 is handled by the next junction. Just after that interchange, they enter Gainesville, where they have an interchange with SR 13 (Atlanta Highway); this interchange has access to both SR 13 and SR 53. Farther into Gainesville is SR 53 Connector/SR 60 (Candler Road/Queen City Parkway). In the main part of the city, US 129/US 129 Business/SR 11 (Athens Highway) meets the concurrency. US 129/SR 11 heads south toward Jefferson, while US 129 joins the concurrency through the rest of the city. Meanwhile, US 129 Business/SR 11 heads north into the heart of Gainesville. Nearly  later US 129 departs the concurrency to the north with SR 369 on Jesse Jewell Parkway. About  later, I-985 ends, while US 23/SR 365 continues north.

This segment of US 23/SR 365 is an example of an unfinished freeway. The first intersection that could have been an interchange is Howard Road, which has a RaceTrac gas station on the southeast corner, and a local YMCA on the northeast corner. The road then intersects Ramsey Road and White Sulphur Road, the latter of which connects the communities of White Sulphur to the north and White Sulphur Springs to the south. East of there, it passes a Kubota RTV manufacturing plant, and a cold storage warehouse. The road runs over a pair or railroad bridges over the same Southern Railway line it got close to in Duluth before the intersection with Cagle Road. A much more important intersection is encountered later on when the routes pass by Ace Hardware franchise, and a gift shop and furniture store just before approaching SR 52 (Lula Road) northwest of Lula, which leads to Clermont. Beyond this point it continues to run up and down the hills of Hall County passing through more minor intersections.

Habersham County
A little ways later,  the highways enter Habersham County where the road is named the Tommy Irwin Parkway. In Baldwin is SR 384 (Duncan Bridge Road), which provides a connection to Helen. Just before entering the northern part of Cornelia, passing a bridge over J. Warren Road with no access. One last diamond interchanges with SR 15 Conn. (Level Grove Road) can be found just before a wye interchange with US 441/SR 15, which leads to Homer and Commerce. They join the concurrency to the northeast. In Cornelia, they intersect US 441 Business/SR 105, which follow the former routing of US 23/US 441/US 23 Business through the area. The four highways curve to the northeast to meet SR 197. Right before entering the Chattahoochee-Oconee National Forest, US 23/US 441/SR 15 heads north, while SR 365 continues to the northeast, along with US 123. Almost immediately after that is a second intersection with US 441 Business, this time concurrent with SR 17 (Toccoa Highway). This intersection marks the northern terminus of US 441 Business and the southern end of the SR 17 concurrency.

Stephens County
The three highways curve to the southeast into Stephens County until they meet SR 184 (Dicks Hill Parkway). Here, SR 17 (Toccoa Bypass) departs to the east, while SR 184 joins the concurrency. Farther to the northeast, in Toccoa, they intersect SR 63/SR 106 (South Broad Street). At this intersection, SR 184 heads north on Broad Street, while US 123/SR 365 continues on to the eastern part of the town, where it intersects with SR 17 Alternate (Big A Road). This highway provides access to Toccoa Falls and is an alternate route to Lavonia. After leaving Toccoa, the two highways continue to the northeast until they meet SR 365's northern terminus, the South Carolina state line at the Tugaloo River, southwest of Westminster, South Carolina, where US 123 continues toward the town.

National Highway System
Except for the extreme northern section, all of SR 365 is included as part of the National Highway System, a system of roadways important to the nation's economy, defense, and mobility.

History

1920s
The roadway that would eventually become SR 365 was built in 1920 as SR 13 from Buford to the South Carolina state line, along the same alignment as it travels today. A reconfiguration of the SR 13 and SR 15 intersection in the Baldwin–Cornelia area, caused the two routes to travel concurrently between the two cities. By the end of 1926, a small section in Gainesville was paved. By 1929, US 23 was designated along the section from Buford to Gainesville.

1930s and 1940s
By 1932, US 23 was designated along the route all the way to Cornelia. In addition, the entire route, from Buford to the South Carolina state line, was paved. The next month, US 23, and possibly SR 13 was extended south from Buford. In 1935, after a long series of improvement projects the section just south of Buford was paved. Between 1946 and 1948, US 123 entered the state, being routed on a concurrency with SR 13 between Toccoa and the state line. Prior to April 1949, US 123's concurrency with SR 13 was extended to Cornelia. During this time, US 441 was extended along SR 15, thus beginning a concurrency with SR 13.

1950s–1970s
Between 1955 and 1957, a freeway (presumably I-85) was under construction from northeast Atlanta northeast to Suwannee, paralleling US 23/SR 13. Between 1957 and 1960, I-85 was completed as far north as what is now known as SR 317, which is located just southwest of what is now the southern terminus of I-985/SR 365, and by 1966, it was completed northeast of Atlanta within the state. In 1966, SR 365 was being projected as a freeway from its current southern terminus northeast and curving around the southeastern side of Gainesville. In 1969, the whole freeway section, with the exception of the southernmost portion from I-85 to US 23/SR 20, was completed. Also, the entire completed section was designated as SR 365. The next year, the southernmost segment was completed. By 1979, the SR 365 freeway was listed as "under construction" from the northern terminus of the freeway northeast to US 23/US 441/SR 15 near Cornelia.

1980s and 1990s
Between 1980 and 1982, SR 365 was extended along the "under construction" section, but it was not a freeway. Also, US 23/SR 13 from Gainesville to Cornelia was moved onto this new highway. By 1986, the entire freeway segment was designated as I-985. In 1988, SR 365 was proposed to be extended to a point southwest of Toccoa. In 1991, SR 13 was decommissioned north of Gainesville. SR 365 was extended to the South Carolina state line.

Major intersections

Habersham County spur route

State Route 365 Spur (SR 365 Spur) was a spur route of SR 365 that was proposed in 1988 to travel from the SR 365 mainline west-northwest of Toccoa to US 23/US 441/SR 15/SR 17 in Hollywood. In 1991, it was built, but was only as an eastward re-routing of SR 15 and possibly US 23.

See also

References

External links

 Georgia Roads (Routes 361 – 380)
 Georgia State Route 365 on State-Ends.com

365
Transportation in Gwinnett County, Georgia
Transportation in Hall County, Georgia
Transportation in Habersham County, Georgia
Transportation in Stephens County, Georgia
Buford, Georgia
Gainesville, Georgia